Nashville tuning may refer to:

 E9 tuning on a steel guitar
 Nashville tuning (high strung), a tuning for a six string guitar